Pasiphila sandycias is a moth in the family Geometridae. It is endemic to New Zealand. Adult moths of this species have been shown to pollinate Leptospermum scoparium and Olearia virgata.

References

Moths described in 1905
sandycias
Moths of New Zealand
Endemic fauna of New Zealand
Taxa named by Edward Meyrick
Endemic moths of New Zealand